Francisco "Paco" Castellano Rodríguez (born 17 November 1944) is a Spanish football coach and former player who played as a centre back.

He spent his 14-year professional career with Las Palmas, amassing totals of 371 games and 17 goals in La Liga.

External links
 
 
 National team data at BDFutbol
 
 Historia del Fútbol Castellano profile 

1944 births
Living people
People from Arucas, Las Palmas
Sportspeople from the Province of Las Palmas
Spanish footballers
Footballers from the Canary Islands
Association football defenders
La Liga players
UD Las Palmas players
Spain youth international footballers
Spain under-23 international footballers
Spain international footballers
Spanish football managers
Segunda División managers
UD Las Palmas managers